André Mocquereau (6 June 1849 – 18 January 1930) was a French monk at Solesmes Abbey, Gregorian musicologist, who had a great influence on the restoration of Gregorian chant thanks to his musical ability.

His scientific studies resulted in the use of the  being ended at the Vatican in 1901.

Publications 
 1908: Le nombre musical grégorien ou rythmique grégorienne — théorie et pratique —, tome I, Société de Saint-Jean-l'Évangéliste ainsi que Desclée & Cie., Rome et Tournai, 430 p. Read online
 1927: Le nombre musical grégorien ou rythmique grégorienne, théorie et pratique, tome II, Desclée, Paris, 855 p.

See also 
 Solesmes Abbey, 
 Gregorian chant
 Liber usualis

Bibliography 
 Études grégoriennes, tome XXVIII, Abbaye Saint-Pierre, Solesmes 2011

 Pierre Combe, Justine Ward and Solesmes, translation by Philipe and Guillemine de Lacoste, The Catholic University of America Press, Washington 1987, 410 p. Read online 

 Daniel Walden (Harvard University), Dom Mocquereau's Theories of Rhythm and Romantic Musical Aesthetics, 2015 (initialement présentée dans les Études grégoriennes, tome XLII, 2015) Read online 

French Benedictines
19th-century French musicologists
20th-century French musicologists
People from Maine-et-Loire
1849 births
1930 deaths